John Hambley is the name of:
 John Hambley (martyr), 16th-century English Catholic and martyr, who died during the reign of Elizabeth I
 John Hambley (producer), 20th-century film producer